The Union Libérale Israélite de France (ULIF), commonly referred to as  the rue Copernic synagogue,  is a Liberal Jewish synagogue, located in Paris, France.  Inaugurated on the first of December 1907, it is the oldest Reform synagogue in France.

History

The synagogue was damaged in a fascist riot in 1941, but was repaired after the war.

1980 attack

On October 3, 1980, on the eve of Simchat Torah, a bombing was directed against the synagogue of the ULIF. A bomb hidden in a motorcycle went off outside the synagogue, killing four pedestrians.

The bombing was the start of a string of other attacks by terrorists against Jews in Europe. In August 1981, a synagogue in Vienna, Austria, was attacked by Palestinian gunmen, killing two people, and in October 1981, three people were killed when a bomb went off in the center of Antwerp, Belgium.

Leadership

Rabbi Louis Germain Levy(1870-1946) trained at the Seminaire Israelite de France served as its first rabbi.

Rabbi Levy was succeeded by Rabbi Andre Chalom Zaoui (1916-2009) in 1946.

In 1970, Rabbi Daniel Farhi (1941-2021) was appointed the new senior rabbi and left ULIF in 1977 to create the second Reform synagogue of Paris, Mouvement Juif Liberal de France. Rabbi Michael Williams assumed the spiritual leadership of the community in the summer of 1977. He retired in 2014.
An Argentinian-Israeli rabbi, Yossef Kleiner, ordained by the Seminario rabinico was named as Williams successor and served the congregation until 2014.

 
Since 2014, Philippe Haddad (ordained by the Seminaire Israelite de France)and Jonas Jacquelin (ordained by Abraham Geiger Kolleg) are its new rabbinic leaders

See also
 Liberal Jewish Movement of France

References

External links
Union Libérale Israélite de France (Official Site) 

1907 establishments in France
Jewish organizations
Reform synagogues in France
Synagogues in Paris
Synagogues completed in 1907
Buildings and structures in the 16th arrondissement of Paris